Jackson Kabiga (born December 1, 1976) is a retired long-distance runner from Kenya, who won the 1998 edition of the Fukuoka Marathon, clocking a personal best 2:08:42 on December 6, 1998. He defeated Japan's Nobuyuki Sato (2:08:48). Earlier that year Kabiga triumphed in the Paris Marathon.

Achievements

External links

 1998 Year Ranking
 

1976 births
Living people
Kenyan male long-distance runners
Place of birth missing (living people)
Paris Marathon male winners
Kenyan male marathon runners
20th-century Kenyan people
21st-century Kenyan people